Ville Heinola (born March 2, 2001) is a Finnish professional ice hockey defenceman currently playing with the Manitoba Moose in the American Hockey League (AHL) as a prospect for the Winnipeg Jets of the National Hockey League (NHL). He was ranked as one of the top international skaters eligible for the 2019 NHL Entry Draft. Heinola was drafted 20th overall by the Jets.

Playing career
On July 15, 2019, Heinola was signed to a three-year, entry-level contract with the Winnipeg Jets.

Heinola impressively made the Jets roster out of training camp. He became the first player of the 2019 NHL Entry Draft to register an NHL point during the Jets first game of the 2019–20 season against the New York Rangers on 3 October 2019. Heinola scored his first career NHL goal on 8 October 2019 against Matt Murray of the Pittsburgh Penguins. Heinola posted 5 points through 8 games before he was re-assigned to AHL affiliate, the Manitoba Moose. After appearing in 3 games with the Moose, Heinola was loaned to continue development with his Finnish club Lukko for the remainder of the season on 8 November 2019.

International play 
Heinola competed with Team Finland at the IIHF World Junior Hockey Championship in 2019, 2020, and 2021, winning the Gold Medal in 2019 and the Bronze Medal in 2021. He was one of two defensemen named to the Media All-Star Team after the end of the 2021 tournament.

Career statistics

Regular season and playoffs

International

References

External links
 

2001 births
Living people
Finnish ice hockey defencemen
Lukko players
Manitoba Moose players
National Hockey League first-round draft picks
Winnipeg Jets draft picks
Winnipeg Jets players
Sportspeople from Satakunta
21st-century Finnish people